Velaikaran or Velaikkaran may refer to:

 Velaikaran (1952 film), an Indian Tamil-language film directed by P. V. Krishnan
 Velaikkaran (1987 film), an Indian Tamil-language film directed by S. P. Muthuraman
 Velaikkaran (2017 film), an Indian Tamil-language film written and directed by Mohan Raja

See also
 Velakkaran, a 1953 Indian Malayalam film